Omorgus zumpti is a species of hide beetle in the subfamily Omorginae and subgenus Afromorgus.

References

zumpti
Beetles described in 1957